Minlacowie Conservation Park is a protected area located in the Yorke Peninsula of South Australia about  west of Stansbury. The conservation park was proclaimed under the National Parks and Wildlife Act 1972 in 2008. The following statement of significance appears in the park's management plan:
Minlacowie Conservation Park (28.5 hectares; proclaimed in 2008) is located about 13 kilometres west of Stansbury. The park comprises a small patch of remnant mallee/broombush vegetation in very good condition, and conserves a number of significant plant species including the nationally and state vulnerable Winter Spider-orchid (Caladenia brumalis).

The conservation park is classified as an IUCN Category VI protected area.

References

External links
Minlacowie Conservation Park webpage on protected planet

Conservation parks of South Australia
Protected areas established in 2008
2008 establishments in Australia
Yorke Peninsula